Moto Hospitality, branded as Moto, is a British service station operator which operates 59 motorway service stations across the United Kingdom. It is currently the UK's largest service area operator.

History

Operations (2001–2020) 

Granada, who owned the chain of Granada motorway service stations, merged with Compass in July 2000 to form Granada Compass plc. The plan was to combine the hospitality interests of the two businesses and hive off the media division, which was done by demerging the new group into Compass plc and Granada Media in 2001.

Previously, Granada had acquired Forte plc in a £3.3bn hostile takeover on 24 January 1996. It sold its French Cote France service stations to Italy's Autogrill in December 1997. The food and hospitality division of Granada was retained by Compass, which became part of its Select Service Partner (SSP) UK division, but ownership of the Granada brand and trademark passed to the new media company. The Granada name was retained on the service stations until 23 May 2001, when the 47 sites were rebranded as Moto.

Upon rebrand, Compass originally intended to use the Moto brand across Europe. In 2003, they created a joint venture with Cremonini to introduce the Moto brand across Italy. In total, 31 Italian rest stops were rebranded Moto over a 3-year period. In 2007, Cremonini bought Compass' stake in the joint company, and rebranded the sites to their own brand, Chef Express. Briefly, in the early 2000s, there was also two French sites under the Moto banner.

In 2006, Moto separated from Compass Group and SSP following successful acquisition by a consortium of investors. Macquarie Bank managed Moto until late 2015, when the company was sold to USS.

In 2008, Moto opened a new service station on the A1(M) at Kirk Deighton near Wetherby, Yorkshire. Also in the same year, they purchased Winchester Services from Roadchef, rebranding the sites under their own name.

Redevelopment Project (2021–present) 

Moto's second new build services, at M6 junction 1 in Rugby, opened on 30 April 2021. The site introduced a new logo and corporate style - the first full update in the company's history.

Moto is currently in the development stage for its third new build service area at a site located near Sawtry, Peterborough, Cambridgeshire on the A1(M).

In 2021, Moto became a franchisee of Pret A Manger and started adding stores to its busier MSA locations.

In 2022, Moto invested £13.5m in refurbishing 5 of its MSA sites to the new logo and branding, refurbishment of toilet & shower facilities, customer seating areas and food outlets. All these sites had a KFC & Pret added to the food offering. 
Sites upgraded included Ferrybridge, Reading, Tamworth, Stafford & Donington Park.

Facilities

Shops 
Until 2007, Moto sites had an own-brand shop to sell products to travellers. After a trial of WHSmith at select sites was deemed successful, the brand was rolled out to most Moto sites, with some exceptions (Leeming Bar, Tiverton and Todhills).

Also trialled were M&S Foodhalls, which were introduced in 2004 and now feature at most Moto locations.

Catering 
 Burger King is at all but two Moto sites (Todhills & Lymm).
 Costa Coffee operates at all Moto service areas.
 Greggs is at most Moto service stations. Moto also operates Greggs at four Extra motorway services as well.
 KFC is available at select larger Moto sites.
 Krispy Kreme operate stalls at most Moto locations.
 Pret a Manger is available at busier Moto service areas.
 West Cornwall Pasty Company now operates where all Upper Crusts used to be, except for Cherwell Valley, Wetherby and Reading Eastbound.

Other facilities

Barbershops 
One site, Lymm, features a barbershop. Previously, Toddington and Leigh Delamere sites also opened but have since closed.

Betting arcades 
In 1995, Granada thought that betting arcades would be useful at motorway services:
 Ladbrokes was the first brand used. Most outlets were closed in 2019.
 Lucky Coin is Moto's own brand betting arcades. They appear at most sites.
 Full Hou$e is another Moto brand betting arcade, replacing some outlets of Lucky Coin.
 &Play is another own brand betting arcade, introduced in 2017.

Hotels

Most Moto locations have hotels:
 Travelodge operates at 56 Moto sites.
 Days Inn is at two Moto sites: Wetherby and Winchester. Winchester Days Inn was opened by Moto but is operated by Welcome Break.

Petrol stations 
The petrol stations at Moto sites are variously Esso or BP.

Play areas 
Selected Moto sites feature an indoor or outdoor play area within or near the main building. Outdoor play areas used to be more common but have been removed from sites for various reasons. Indoor play areas were first introduced to two service areas, Leigh Delamere Westbound and Donington, in 2016. Another indoor play area opened at Rugby in 2021.

Other operations

Moto operates various franchise outlets at some Extra MSA services. These include M&S Simply Food, Costa Coffee, West Cornwall Pasty Company, Krispy Kreme and Greggs.

Awards
Moto won awards for the quality of their internal training programme "Achieve In Moto" (AIM) at the Training Journal Awards in 2017. Moto won Gold in the category "Best Private/Commercial Programme" and also two Silver awards in the categories "Best Talent Development Programme" and "Best Operational Programme".

Moto have won awards for the standards of cleanliness in their public toilets, winning the 'Loo of the Year Award' in 2006 (for the fourth year running).

Locations

 Barton Park - A1(M) J56
 Birch - M62 between J18 and J19
 Blyth - A1(M) J34
 Bridgwater - M5 J24
 Burton-in-Kendal - M6 between J35 and J36 northbound only
 Cardiff West - M4 J33
 Cherwell Valley - M40 J10
 Chieveley - M4 J13, A34
 Doncaster North - M18 J5, M180
 Donington Park - M1 J23a, A42
 Dover Port - A2, A20, Dover ferry terminal
 Exeter - M5 J30
 Ferrybridge - M62 J33, also accessible from A1(M)
 Frankley - M5 between J3 and J4
 Grantham North - A1, B1174 junction
 Heston - M4 between J2 and J3
 Hilton Park - M6 between J10a and J11
 Kinross - M90 J6
 Knutsford - M6 between J18 and J19
 Lancaster - M6 between J32 and J33
 Leeming Bar - A1(M) J51 
 Leigh Delamere - M4 between J17 and J18
 Lymm - M6 J20, also accessible from M56
 Medway - M2 between J4 and J5
 Pease Pottage - M23 J11
 Reading - M4 between J11 and J12
 Rugby - M6 J1
 Scotch Corner - A1(M) J55
 Severn View - M48 J1
 Southwaite - M6 between J41 and J42
 Stafford Northbound - M6 between J14 and J15
 Stirling - M9 J9, M80 J9
 Swansea - M4 J47
 Tamworth - M42 J10
 Thurrock - M25 J30/J31, A13
 Tiverton - M5 J27
 Toddington - M1 between J11a and J12
 Todhills - M6 between J44 and J45
 Trowell - M1 between J25 and J26
 Washington - A1(M) between J64 and J65
 Wetherby - A1(M) J46
 Winchester - M3 between J8 and J9
 Woolley Edge - M1 between J38 and J39

Planned
 Sawtry - A1(M) J15

See also
 Rest area
 RoadChef
 Welcome Break
 Extra

Notes

References

External links

 Moto-Way (official website)
 Select Service Partner UK
 Moto - Motorway Services Online
 Reviews at Ciao!

Catering and food service companies of the United Kingdom
British companies established in 2001
Retail companies established in 2001
Food and drink companies established in 2001
Hospitality companies established in 2001
Companies based in Bedfordshire